Six is the sixth and final studio album by American hip hop group Whodini and their first and only record released via Jermaine Dupri's So So Def label. It was released in 1996 along with the single "Keep Running Back". Audio production was handled by Dave Atkinson, Red Spyda, Carl So-Lowe, and Jermaine Dupri, who also served as executive producer.

Unlike other albums, this is the first album of Whodini with extensive use of expletives in lyrics due to changes of the rap industry growing. Also, the album doesn't continue the trend of 80s esque synthesizer sounds and discarded with a hard-core edge style pioneered by LL Cool J Onyx & Run-DMC among others.

Chart performance
The album peaked at No. 55 on the Billboard Top R&B Albums chart. The single, "Keep Running Back", peaked at No. 27 on the Hot Rap Songs chart and No. 69 on the Hot R&B Singles chart.

Track listing

Samples
Track 3 contains elements from "Your Body's Callin'" by R. Kelly (1993)
Track 6 contains elements from "Everything I Miss at Home" by Cherrelle (1988)
Track 7 contains elements from "Feels So Real (Won't Let Go)" by Patrice Rushen (1984) and "I Got My Mind Made Up" by Instant Funk (1978)
Track 9 contains elements from "The Finer Things in Life" by Chuck Stanley (1987)
Track 10 contains elements from "Kamurshol" by N.W.A (1990)

Personnel

Jalil Hutchins - performer
John "Ecstacy" Fletcher - performer
Robert Sylvester Kelly - vocals (track 3)
Lloyd Lorenz Smith - vocals (track 6)
Trina Lanell Broussard - vocals (track 7)
Nicole Jackson - vocals (track 9)
LaMarquis Jefferson - bass (tracks: 3, 13), guitar (track 10)
Jermaine Dupri - executive producer, producer & mixing (tracks: 2-3, 6-7, 9-10, 13)
Dave Atkinson - producer & mixing (tracks: 5, 7, 11)
Andy "Red Spyda" Thelusma - producer & mixing (tracks: 5, 7, 11)
Carl So-Lowe - co-producer (tracks: 10, 13)
Phil Tan - mixing (tracks: 2-3, 6-7, 9-10, 13), recording (tracks: 3, 10)
Mike Wilson - recording (tracks: 5, 7)
Dexter Simmons - recording (track 5)
Mike Alvord - recording (track 11)
Brian Lee - mastering
Diane Makowski - A&R
Frank Edwards - A&R coordination
Danny Clinch - photography
LaTanya Davis - art direction

References

External links 

1996 albums
Whodini albums
Columbia Records albums
Albums produced by Jermaine Dupri